Jakob (Jack) Reimer (November 6, 1918 – August 3, 2005) was a Trawniki camp guard who later emigrated to the United States and became a salesman and restaurant manager.

Biography

Early life in USSR
Born to Russian Mennonite parents in Friedensdorf in southeastern Ukraine, Reimer studied to be a librarian.

Second World War
In 1940, Reimer was drafted into the Soviet Army. When Germany invaded the Soviet Union on June 22, 1941, Reimer entered combat and was captured by German forces on July 6. Two months later, due to his ethnic German heritage and language skills, he was recruited to the Trawniki concentration camp for training as a camp guard.

While serving as a camp guard, Reimer participated in the liquidation of Jewish ghettos in Poland, in addition to administrative and office duties. On one occasion, Reimer fired a shot while at a pit containing corpses and at least one live civilian, which would later prove pivotal in his US denaturalization trial. In 1944, he received a War Merit Cross for his service, and was promoted to SS Senior Platoon Guard (SS-Oberzugwachmann) in 1945.

In 1944, Reimer gained German citizenship after Adolf Hitler made all ethnic German military and police personnel eligible for German citizenship.

United States 
In 1952, Reimer applied for a visa to the United States and was naturalized as a United States citizen on April 28, 1959. During his time in the United States, he worked as a Wise potato chip salesman and a restaurant manager, and lived in Brooklyn, New York. After he retired, he moved to Carmel, New York, and was living in Fort Lee, New Jersey at the time of his death.

Reimer was first investigated by American authorities in 1980 in connection with the John Demjanjuk case, but minimal progress was made during this initial investigation. Not until the fall of the Soviet Union and the end of Communism in the Eastern Bloc did investigators make substantial progress, as formerly restricted archives were opened up to Western historians. In 1992 the Office of Special Investigations filed a denaturalization suit against Reimer, and following a bench trial in 1998, Reimer was denaturalized on September 5, 2002. He appealed his denaturalization, but the United States Court of Appeals for the Second Circuit upheld it on January 27, 2004. In 2005, the government sought to deport Reimer, and he agreed to leave for Germany, but he died before his deportation could be completed.

In literature
Reimer, who was Trawniki recruit No. 865, figured predominantly in Citizen 865: The Hunt for Hitler's Hidden Soldiers in America (listed below).

References

Sources

 Access by free subscription (January 2021).

1918 births
2005 deaths
Anabaptist–Jewish relations
Loss of United States citizenship by prior Nazi affiliation
Trawniki concentration camp
Nazi concentration camp personnel
Holocaust perpetrators in Poland
Soviet military personnel of World War II from Ukraine
Soviet prisoners of war
World War II prisoners of war held by Germany
Naturalized citizens of the United States
Russian Mennonites
Soviet emigrants to the United States